Achille Marozzo (1484–1553) was an Italian fencing master, one of the most important teachers in the Dardi or Bolognese tradition.

Marozzo was probably born in Bologna. His text Opera Nova dell'Arte delle Armi (roughly equivalent to "The New Text on the Art of Arms") was published in 1536 in Modena, dedicated to Count Rangoni, then reprinted several times all the way into the next century. It is considered one of the most important works about fencing in the 16th century. It exemplifies theory, sequences and techniques about combat with different weapons, such as:
Sword and Small Buckler
Sword and Broad Buckler
Sword and Targa
Sword and Dagger
Sword and Cape
Sword-Alone
Sword and Rotella
Large Dagger with and without Cape
Sword for Two Hands
Polearms (Lance, Ronca, Spetum, and Partisan)
Unarmed against Dagger

He also includes a fairly comprehensive treatise on judicial dueling customs in Italy. The text was originally embellished with woodcuts, while after the 1568 edition, copperplate engravings were used.

Achille Marozzo states he studied swordsmanship under Guido Antonio Di Luca, about whom he says that "as many warriors came out of his school as did out of the Trojan horse". Later Bolognese fencing masters such as Viggiani and Dall'Agocchie may have been influenced by his work, if not directly studied under him.

Today, Marozzo's work is studied and researched by several historical fencing groups in different countries.

See also
Bolognese Swordsmanship
Italian school of swordsmanship

References

External links
The Teachings of Marozzo
Marozzo's Progression
Sala d'Arme Achille Marozzo (Italian Ancient Fencing Art Institute) transcriptions Marozzo's Opera Nova
An introduction to the use of single sword and sword and buckler, according to the work of Achille Marozzo by Phil Marshall and Oliver Barker of The School of the Sword.
An introduction to the play of two swords, one in each hand, according to the work of Achille Marozzo by Phil Marshall and Oliver Barker of The School of the Sword.
Bolognese Swordplay & the Dardi Tradition by William Wilson; contains a partial English translation of Books I & II of Arte dell'Armi.
Opera nova chiamata Duello (Tables only)

1484 births
1553 deaths
People from the Province of Bologna
Italian male fencers
Italian soldiers
Italian male writers
16th-century Italian writers
Historical European martial arts
Historical fencing